Pacific studies is the study of the Pacific region (Oceania) across academic disciplines such as anthropology, archeology, art, economics, geography, history, linguistics, literature, music, politics, or sociology.

In the fields of anthropology and linguistics, Oceania is often subdivided into Melanesia, Micronesia, and Polynesia, while also including Australasia. In archeology and prehistory, Oceania extends into the southern Pacific Rim of Asia, especially the islands now comprising Indonesia, Malaysia, the Philippines, and Taiwan. Study of the history, economics, and politics from the colonial period on is inextricably bound to that of the major colonial powers: Britain, France, Germany, Japan, the Netherlands, Spain, Russia, the United States, and later Australia, New Zealand, and Indonesia. The field is sometimes seen as including Hawaiian studies and Māori studies.

For many Pacific Islanders, Pacific studies involves projects of cultural renaissance, the reclamation and reassertion of cultural identity, while for many others, Pacific studies tends to focus more on modernization and development, on how to understand the region in ways that will improve people's lives. Wesley-Smith observed that a third rationale for Pacific Studies, particularly amongst outsiders to the Pacific, was driven by geopolitical considerations evident in Area Studies.

History
The Australian National University established its Research School of Pacific Studies in 1946. The University of Hawaii at Manoa in 1950 began offering the first graduate-level course in Pacific Studies in 1950. Both of these early establishments were driven by a desire of their funding countries for better understanding of the Pacific region, with ANU having a particular focus on Papua New Guinea. In 1976 the newly-formed University of the South Pacific established the Institute of Pacific Studies under Professor Ron Crocombe. Unlike its Australian and American counterparts, this was driven by a desire to deepen students' awareness of Pacific identity and the region. A foundation course in Pacific studies is still included in every USP undergraduate programme. In New Zealand, the University of Auckland's Pacific Studies programme was established in the 1990's and driven by the needs and concerns of New Zealand Pacific islanders.

Institutions
 Australian National University
 Brigham Young University–Hawaii
 CNRS
 EHESS
 National Museum of Ethnology, Japan
 SOAS
 San Diego State University
 San Francisco State University
 Tokyo University of Foreign Studies
 University of Auckland
 University of Canterbury
 University of California, San Diego
 University of Hawaii at Manoa
 University of Oregon
 University of Otago
 University of the South Pacific
 Victoria University of Wellington
 University of Victoria, Canada
 City College of San Francisco
 College of San Mateo

Journals and associations
The Association for Social Anthropology in Oceania (ASAO) was established in 1967 and focuses on comparative studies of Pacific topics. The European Society for Oceanists (ESFO) was established in 1992. The Australian Association for Pacific Studies (AAPS) was formed in 2004.

Journals include:
 Asian Perspectives: The Journal of Archaeology for Asia and the Pacific
 Oceanic Linguistics
 Manoa: A Pacific Journal of International Writing
 Pacific Science
 Pacific Studies (journal)
 The Contemporary Pacific
 The Journal of Pacific History
 MATAMAI: An Anthology of Poems, Short stories, songs, and art by students of Pacific Islands Studies

See also

References

 Hviding, Edvard. 2003. Between Knowledges: Pacific Studies and Academic Disciplines. The Contemporary Pacific 15: 43–73.
 Thaman, Konai Helu. 2003. Decolonizing Pacific Studies: Indigenous Perspectives, Knowledge, and Wisdom in Higher Education. The Contemporary Pacific 15: 1-17.
 Other articles in the Special Issue: Back to the Future: Decolonizing Pacific Studies, edited by Vilsoni Hereniko and Terence Wesley-Smith, The Contemporary Pacific'' 15 (2003).

External links
 Center for Pacific Islands Studies (UH)
 Center for Pacific Studies (SDSU)
 The Journal of Pacific History
 Pacific corpus at New Zealand Electronic Text Collection

Area studies
Oceanianism